Louis José Lucien Dolhem (26 April 1944 – 16 April 1988) was a racing driver from France, and the half brother (and also 1st cousin) of Formula One driver Didier Pironi (they had the same father and their mothers were sisters).

Dolhem was born in Paris. He participated in three Formula One Grands Prix, debuting on 7 July 1974, and scoring no championship points.  His single grand prix start came to end when he was withdrawn by his team after his team-mate Helmuth Koinigg's fatal accident during the season-ending US Grand Prix.

Dolhem died in a plane crash at Saint-Just-Saint-Rambert near Saint-Etienne in 1988. Dolhem and Pironi, who died while offshore powerboat racing eight months earlier, are buried in the same plot at Grimaud, near St Tropez in southern France.

Racing record

Complete European Formula Two Championship results
(key) (Races in bold indicate pole position; races in italics indicate fastest lap)

24 Hours of Le Mans results

Complete Formula One results
(key)

References

1944 births
1988 deaths
French racing drivers
French Formula One drivers
Surtees Formula One drivers
European Formula Two Championship drivers
Racing drivers from Paris
24 Hours of Le Mans drivers
Victims of aviation accidents or incidents in France
World Sportscar Championship drivers